Flight 178 may refer to:

 Air France Flight 178, crashed on 1 September 1953
 Ural Airlines Flight 178, crashed on 15 August 2019

0178